East Lincoln High School is a high school located in Denver, North Carolina. It is a part of the Lincoln County Schools district. The school was established in 1967. Its mascot is the Mustangs. The school colors are orange and green.

Athletics
East Lincoln team North Carolina High School Athletic Association (NCHSAA) state championships include:
2014 2AA Football
2013 2A Women's Cross Country
2012 2A Football
2009 2A Men's Cross Country 
2007 1A/2A Men's Swimming
2006 1A/2A Men's Swimming
1973 All Classes Women's Basketball

Notable alumni 
 Alec Burleson, current MLB outfielder
 Chazz Surratt, current NFL linebacker

References

External links 
East Lincoln High School official website
East Lincoln High School Bands website

Schools in Lincoln County, North Carolina
Public high schools in North Carolina